Michael Locke (February 14, 1929 in Nottingham, U.K – October 20, 2013 in London, Ontario) was an English-born Canadian biologist.  He was Chair of Zoology at Western University from 1971 to 1985 and a Fellow of the Royal Society of Canada.

References

1929 births
2013 deaths
Fellows of the Royal Society of Canada
Canadian biologists
Academic staff of the University of Western Ontario
Scientists from Nottingham